Kuntur Ikiña (Aymara kunturi condor, ikiña to sleep, bed or blanket, "bed of the condor" or "resting place of the condor", Hispanicized spelling Condor Iquiña) is a  mountain in the Andes located in the Cordillera Occidental of Bolivia. It is situated in the Oruro Department, Sajama Province, Turco Municipality, north-east of Umurata  and south of the Bolivian Route 4 that leads to Tambo Quemado on the border with Chile.

See also
List of mountains in the Andes
Guallatiri
Wila Qullu

References 

Mountains of Oruro Department